Çifthisar is a village in the Gerger District, Adıyaman Province, Turkey. The village is populated by Kurds of the Mirdêsî tribe and had a population of 123 in 2021.

References

Villages in Gerger District

Kurdish settlements in Adıyaman Province